James Howard (c. 1640 – July 1669) was an English dramatist and member of a Royalist family during the English Civil War and the Restoration.

He was the eighth son of Thomas Howard and Werburge Kirkhoven, daughter of James, Lord of Heenvliet, Holland, and grandson of Theophilus Howard, 2nd Earl of Suffolk (1584–1640), and Elizabeth Home (d. 1633), daughter of the earl of Dunbar. 

Howard married  Charlotte Fitzroy, a daughter of the Stuart King Charles II and Elizabeth Killigrew. Their daughter was named Stuarta.

Works
Howard wrote two comedies, All Mistaken, or the Mad Couple, (c.1667), and The English Mounsieur (1666). Both  starred Nell Gwynn, the mistress of Charles II.

Three of Howard's brothers also wrote plays: Edward Howard, Colonel Henry Howard, and Robert Howard. A sister, Elizabeth Howard, married the poet John Dryden.

References

1669 deaths
17th-century English dramatists and playwrights
17th-century male writers
English male dramatists and playwrights
English people of Dutch descent
James
Younger sons of earls
Year of birth uncertain